

B06A Other hematological agents

B06AA Enzymes
B06AA02 Fibrinolysin and desoxyribonuclease
B06AA03 Hyaluronidase
B06AA04 Chymotrypsin
B06AA07 Trypsin
B06AA10 Desoxyribonuclease
B06AA55 Streptokinase, combinations

B06AB Heme products
B06AB01 Hemin

B06AC Drugs used in hereditary angioedema
B06AC01 C1-inhibitor, plasma derived
B06AC02 Icatibant
B06AC03 Ecallantide
B06AC04 Conestat alfa
B06AC05 Lanadelumab
B06AC06 Berotralstat

B06AX Other hematological agents
B06AX01 Crizanlizumab
B06AX02 Betibeglogene autotemcel
B06AX03 Voxelotor
B06AX04 Mitapivat

References

B06